William Thornton (1759–1828) was an American physician, inventor, painter and architect. 

William Thornton or Bill Thornton may also refer to:

William Thornton (academic), principal of Hart Hall, later Hertford College, Oxford, 1688–1707
William Thornton (immigrant) (1620–1708), early American colonist 
William Thornton (died 1769) (died 1769), English militia officer and politician
William Thornton (Virginia burgess) (1717–1790), Colonial Virginia planter and politician
William Thornton (British Army officer) (1779–1840), British general
William Thornton (Kansas politician), Kansas politician
William E. Thornton (1929-2021), American astronaut
William J. Thornton (1878-1951), American businessman and politician
William L. Thornton (1844–1915), New York politician and judge
William Neville John Thornton, Northern Irish politician
William Patton Thornton (1817–1883), American physician
William Taylor Thornton (1843–1916), governor of New Mexico Territory, 1893–1897
William Wheeler Thornton (1851–1932), American jurist and author from Indiana
Willie Thornton (1920–1991), Scottish footballer 
William Thornton (firefighter) (1826–1848), first firefighter to die on the job in Ontario
William Thornton (fireboat), see fireboats of Toronto
Willie Thornton (Canadian football) (born 1986), Canadian football wide receiver
Bill Thornton, mayor of San Antonio, Texas, 1995–1997
Bill Thornton (American football) (1939–2008), American football fullback
Billy Bob Thornton (born 1955), American actor
Billy Thornton (rugby league), rugby league footballer of the 1940s for England, and Hunslet
William Thornton (Queensland politician) (1817–1884), member of the Queensland Legislative Council
William Thomas Thornton (1813–1880), economist, civil servant and author